The Quonset Air Museum was an aerospace museum  located in Quonset Point Business Park in North Kingstown, Rhode Island.

The museum's collection included: missiles, aircraft and over 5000 smaller aviation artifacts. An extensive archive of magazines, manuals, photos and blueprints were stored within the Quonset Air Museum.

Notable aircraft in the collection included the last surviving Curtiss XF15C mixed propulsion prototype and a twin tail C-1A Trader. This one of a kind aircraft had been fitted with twin tails and radome (but without associated electronics) to serve the aerodynamic prototype for the E-1 Tracer Electronic Counter Measure aircraft. This C-1A has the distinction of being the last aircraft to fly from Naval Air Station Quonset Point upon its closure in 1974. The museum housed several Vietnam era aircraft as well as the legendary Grumman F-14 Tomcat almost all the air craft and most small items were on loan from USN Heritage, Pensacola Florida.

History
The museum recovered an F6F-5 Hellcat from Martha's Vineyard on 4 December 1993. It became the subject of a court battle after the U.S. Navy claimed that the aircraft had been salvaged without their permission. Eventually, a settlement was reached where the museum received the aircraft on loan from the Navy.

An Antonov An-2 at the museum was given to the Antonov Foundation in 2004. The following year David H. Payne Sr. became the museum president.

The museum occupied Painting Hangar #488 located at what was once the Naval Air Station Quonset Point. This 50,000 sq. ft. facility was one of only three existing specialized wood and brick hangars built during WWII. Heavy snowfall in March 2015 partially collapsed the building's roof and the hangar was condemned.

In January 2016, plans for a new museum were announced. The museum was originally supposed to leave by April 2, but it was given an extension. Later, in June, a $4 million request for state funding failed to materialize. On December 16, 2016, it was announced that the museum would not reopen. Although many aircraft in the collection have been transferred to other museums, the museum's P2V was scrapped in May 2018, as it was too large to move.

Formerly on display

Curtiss XF15C 01215
Douglas AD-5W Skyraider 135188
Douglas A-4M Skyhawk, BuNo 158148
Douglas F3D-2Q Skyknight 124620
FV433 Abbot SPG
General Motors TBM-3E Avenger 53914
Grumman A-6E Intruder 155629
Grumman C-1A Trader 136792
Grumman F-14 Tomcat
Grumman F6F Hellcat 3/4 scale hand built
Grumman F6F Hellcat 70185
Hughes OH-6 Cayuse
Lockheed P2V Neptune 131427
LTV A-7D Corsair II 75-0408
M35 Recovery Truck
McDonnell Douglas AV-8B Harrier II
McDonnell Douglas F-4A Phantom II
Mikoyan-Gurevich MiG-17F
MIM-14 Nike-Hercules
Sikorsky SH-3H Sea King 149738
Silkworm missile
Type 74 37 mm AA gun
ZPU-4 Type 56 AA gun

References

External links
Quonset Air Museum Website
Quonset Air Museum Photos of aircraft and aviation related exhibits at the Quonset Air Museum

Museums in Washington County, Rhode Island
Aerospace museums in Rhode Island
Military and war museums in Rhode Island
Buildings and structures in North Kingstown, Rhode Island